Portuguese Castle may refer to:

Castles in Portugal
Fort of Our Lady of the Conception in Hormoz island, also known as the Portuguese Castle
Rasini, also known as Portuguese Castle